Events from the year 1478 in Ireland.

Incumbent
Lord: Edward IV

Deaths
18 February – George Plantagenet, 1st Duke of Clarence, third son of Richard Plantagenet, 3rd Duke of York (born 1449).
John Butler, 6th Earl of Ormonde.

References

 
1470s in Ireland
Ireland
Years of the 15th century in Ireland